Koponya is a rural locality (a khutor) in Kalmykovskoye Rural Settlement, Kletsky District, Volgograd Oblast, Russia. The population was 21 as of 2010. There are 2 streets.

Geography 
Koponya is located in steppe, 56 km southwest of Kletskaya (the district's administrative centre) by road. Kiselev is the nearest rural locality.

References 

Rural localities in Kletsky District